The Károlyi Castle is a 19th-century castle, of Classicist and Eclectic styles, it is located in the village of Fehérvárcsurgó in the Fejér County, Hungary. The complex was built by György Károlyi from the Károlyi noble family, designed by architects Henrich Koch and Miklós Ybl. There are 20 rooms in the building, and there is a guided tour.

History 
From 1691 the Hochburg family was the first owner of the estate in Fehérvárcsurgó, then a branch of the Berényi family inherited it, and later the Perényi family. According to records, before 1786 in the site of today's castle was the Baroque Castle of Baron Ignác Perényi. In 1834, the estate was pledged by Imre Perényi to the Count György Károlyi, who was a founding member of the Hungarian Academy of Sciences with a donation of 40,000 HUF at the Reformation Assembly. In 1853, the area was finally bought by the Károlyi family by way of purchase. The castle was built between 1844 and 1851 according to the plans of Henrich Koch, who also remodeled the Classicist Károlyi Palace of Pest, the architect who lived in Vienna was represented by Miklós Ybl, who as architect of the Károlyi family, was involved in the planning of the management.

After the death of György Károlyi in 1877, the castle was inherited by his second-born son Viktor. and after his early death, in 1888 the castle was owned by Gyula Károlyi, the organizer and first president of the Hungarian Red Cross Association. His eldest son Mihály Károlyi was a politician, and his younger son József Károlyi, who was the grandson of György Károlyi the current trustee, the chief spokesman and parliamentary representative of Fejér County and Székesfehérvár designed the Eclectic and Baroque facade of the courtyard of the building in 1910, with the center of the U-shaped arch changed the overall effect of the facade. That's when the library room came into the middle. The last owner of the estate was István Károlyi, who during the World War II was the founder-owner of the Madách Theater in Budapest. Following the World War II, the castle and estate were removed from the Károlyi family and nationalized without compensation. From 1946 it was utilized by Budapest Gas Works as a resort. In 1949 was used as a refugee home for Greek children, and then it became a Hungarian state foster home from 1955 to 1979, it then operated as a public education home until the 1980s. In 1995 the castle was managed by the National Monument Administration (MAG). In 1997, the József Károlyi Foundation was established by György Károlyi, living in Paris, and the MAG signed a cooperation agreement for the joint renovation and utilization of the castle. Currently, the Palace Cultural Center is a member of the European Network of Cultural Centers. In order to complement and maintain the cultural functions, the castle aims to integrate into the tourist streams with the help of the hotel and hospitality departments. In 1995 this design was awarded with the Decade of Cultural Heritage of the UNESCO. At the same time as the scientific and cultural activities of the foundation, the Károlyi Castle Development and Operations Ltd. continues managing the castle.

Description

The castle is a one-storey Classicist building, middle avant-corps, a tympanum, the building has 20 rooms, a chapel, a library, a conference hall and a restaurant. On the side of the castle rises its 30-meter-high tower, with 1-1 branch tower on its four corners, with balustrades between them. The architects created a small French garden in the courtyard.

Activities and library
The castle is open to visitors throughout the year, with permanent and temporary exhibitions. Permanent programs include an international conference on a wide range of topics to be held in March. In addition to the Hungarian speakers, international experts on the subject also speak. In the spring, the European Ornamental and Horticultural Days will be held, where you can meet representatives of Hungarian horticulture and learn about the floristry of European countries. The September program is the Quartettissimo Európai Vonósnégyes Festival, where performances by Hungarian and foreign string quartets can be heard. The candlelit concert held once in the summer and in winter is also very popular.

Before the death of the writer Ferenc Fejtő in France, he donated his library of thousands of volumes, including his own work, to the Károlyi Castle of Fehérvárcsurgó.

Inside the palace there is a book by the renowned historian Szabolcs de Vajay, a researcher of genealogy and heraldry. In addition to the basic documents concerning Hungarian and European family history, archival material (correspondence, notes, manuscripts, etc.) can be found in the castle's decorative library.

The park 
The park is a 40-hectare arboretum. For over 150 years there are pines, lindens, oaks and chestnuts, as well as lakes, promenades and bridges. In 2014, the renovation of the castle park started with the use of EU funds, from about 240 million HUF. In the first phase of the renovation, the central part of the park will be renewed, trees and shrubs will be planted, the previously dried-up lake and bridges and garden pavilions will be restored.

Gallery

See also
List of castles in Hungary

References

External links

Buildings and structures in Fehérvárcsurgó
Classicist architecture
Eclectic architecture
Residential buildings completed in the 19th century
Buildings and structures completed in 1851
Castles in Hungary
Palaces in Hungary